Han Won-chol (born 10 January 1987) is a North Korean former footballer. He represented North Korea on at least one occasion in 2007.

Career statistics

International

References

1987 births
Living people
North Korean footballers
North Korea international footballers
Association football goalkeepers